Junkin is a surname, and may refer to

 George Junkin, Presbyterian minister and president of Lafayette College
 George C. Junkin, member of the Nebraska House of Representatives.
 George G. Junkin, lawyer 
 John Junkin, British comic actor and writer
 Mike Junkin, American football player
 Trey Junkin, American football player

See also
 Jenkin
 Jenkins